Thomas James O'Connor (born 21 April 1999) is an Irish professional footballer who plays as a defender and midfielder for Wrexham.

Club career 

Born in Kilkenny, O'Connor first joined the Southampton academy in 2015. He was contracted to the club until June 2021 having signed a two-year contract extension in January 2019.

On 29 August 2019 O'Connor signed for League One side Gillingham on loan until January 2020. He made his debut for the club two days later in a 5–0 league win over Bolton Wanderers. His first league goal for the club was an 83rd-minute equaliser against Bristol Rovers on 17 September 2019.

On 31 December 2019 his loan with the club was extended until the end of the 2019–20 season. He returned to Southampton at the conclusion of the 2019–20 season, having made 32 appearances for the Kent side in all competitions. On 29 September 2020 he re-signed for Gillingham on loan for the 2020–21 season.

On 23 June 2021 it was announced that he would sign a two-year deal for League One side Burton Albion following the expiry of his Southampton contract. 

He moved to Wrexham of the National League for an undisclosed fee in January 2022, making his debut for the Welsh side in a 1–0 away league defeat to Torquay United.

International career 
O'Connor was called up to the Republic of Ireland U19 squad in February 2017. He made his debut as a substitute in a 1–0 win over Portugal.

He was called up to the Republic of Ireland U21 squad in November 2019, making his debut in a 0–1 win over Armenia in a 2021 UEFA European Under-21 Championship qualifier.

Career statistics

Honours
Wrexham
FA Trophy runner-up: 2021–22

References

1999 births
Living people
Republic of Ireland association footballers
Southampton F.C. players
Gillingham F.C. players
Burton Albion F.C. players
Wrexham A.F.C. players
English Football League players
Association football defenders
Association football midfielders
Republic of Ireland youth international footballers
Republic of Ireland under-21 international footballers
National League (English football) players